Tatargina is a genus of moths in the family Erebidae. The genus was erected by Arthur Gardiner Butler in 1877.

Selected species
 Tatargina picta (Walker, [1865])

Subgenus Hindargina Dubatolov, 2006 

 Tatargina ceylonensis (Hampson, 1901)
 Tatargina pannosa (Moore, 1879)
 Tatargina sipahi (Moore, 1872)

References

Dubatolov, V. V. (2006). "Review of the genus Tatargina Butler, 1877, with a description of a new subgenus (Lepidoptera, Arctiidae)". Atalanta. 37 (1/2): 206–215, Würzburg.

Spilosomina
Moth genera